The National Insurance Contributions Act 2008 (c 16) is an Act of the Parliament of the United Kingdom which amends the law in relation to National insurance contribution.

Section 1 - Amount to be specified as upper earnings limit: Great Britain
This section extends to England and Wales and Scotland.

Section 2 - Amount to be specified as upper earnings limit: Northern Ireland
This section extends to Northern Ireland.

Section 3 - Additional pension: upper accrual point to replace upper earnings limit from 2009-10
This section extends to England and Wales and Scotland.

Section 4 - Consequential amendments and repeals
This section extends to each part of the United Kingdom.

Section 5 - Extent
This section extends to each part of the United Kingdom.

Section 6 - Commencement
This section extends to each part of the United Kingdom.

Section 6(2) provides that paragraph 6(3) of Schedule 1, and Schedule 2 so far as relating to the repeals mentioned in that paragraph, come into force on the day appointed by an order under section 30(2) of the Pensions Act 2007 for the coming into force of paragraph 45(2) of Schedule 4 to that Act.

Section 6(1) provides that the rest of the Act came into force at the end of the period of two months that began on the date on which it was passed. The word "months" means calendar months. The day (that is to say, 21 July 2008) on which the Act was passed (that is to say, received royal assent) is included in the period of two months. This means that the rest of the Act came into force on 21 September 2008.

Section 7 - Short title
This section extends to each part of the United Kingdom.

Schedules 1 and 2
An amendment or repeal contained in either Schedule has the same extent as the provision amended or repealed.

References
Halsbury's Statutes,

External links
The National Insurance Contributions Act 2008, as amended from the National Archives.
The National Insurance Contributions Act 2008, as originally enacted from the National Archives.
Explanatory notes to the National Insurance Contributions Act 2008.

United Kingdom Acts of Parliament 2008
National Insurance